Dichomeris helianthemi is a moth in the family Gelechiidae. It is found in Spain, France and Italy.

The forewings are pale mouse-grey, sprinkled with fuscous scales and with a slight fuscous suffusion along the costa and three ill-defined fuscous spots along the disc, the first near the base and the second before the middle, the third at the end of the cell. The hindwings are pale stone-grey.

The larvae feed on Helianthemum lavandulaefolium.

References

Moths described in 1903
helianthemi